Standard Chartered Hong Kong (officially Standard Chartered Bank (Hong Kong) Limited) is a licensed bank incorporated in Hong Kong and a subsidiary of Standard Chartered. It is also one of the three commercial banks licensed by the Hong Kong Monetary Authority to issue banknotes for the Hong Kong dollar.

History
The history of Standard Chartered in Hong Kong dates back to 1859, when The Chartered Bank of India, Australia and China opened a branch in Hong Kong. The Bank started issuing banknotes of the Hong Kong dollar in 1862, and still does so today.

In 2000, Standard Chartered acquired Hong Kong-based retail banking business of the Chase Manhattan Bank, including Chase Manhattan Card Company Limited. In 2010, Standard Chartered acquired the Hong Kong consumer operations of GE Capital.

An office tower, the Standard Chartered Bank Building, in Des Voeux Road, Central, Hong Kong is named after the bank. The building is now owned by Hang Lung Group.

The Chairperson of the Board is Katherine Tsang, younger sister of former Chief Executive of Hong Kong, Donald Tsang, and formerly chairwoman for Greater China operations.  She took up the top job on 1 January 2011, succeeding Chow Chung-Kong, who held the post from 2004.

Local incorporation
On 1 July 2004, Standard Chartered completed the local incorporation of its Hong Kong businesses, namely the Hong Kong branch of Standard Chartered Bank, Manhattan Card Company Ltd, Standard Chartered Finance Ltd, Standard Chartered International Trade Products Ltd and Chartered Capital Corporation Ltd. The bank operates as a licensed bank in Hong Kong under the name of Standard Chartered Bank (Hong Kong) Ltd.

Banknotes

Standard Chartered Bank (Hong Kong) Limited is one of the three commercial banks licensed by the Hong Kong Monetary Authority to issue banknotes in Hong Kong, the other two being the Bank of China (Hong Kong) and The Hongkong and Shanghai Banking Corporation. The Bank has been issuing banknotes since the 1860s (as The Chartered Bank of India, Australia and China).

Leading to the incorporation of the bank on 1 July 2004, the Legislative Council of Hong Kong amended Legal Tender Notes Issue Ordinance. The amendment replaced Standard Chartered Bank with its newly incorporated subsidiary - Standard Chartered Bank (Hong Kong) Ltd - as one of the note-issuing banks in Hong Kong.

Leadership 

 Regional Chief Executive: Benjamin Hung (since October 2015)
 Hong Kong Chief Executive: Mary Huen (since March 2017)

List of Former Regional Chief Executives 
Since the local incorporation of Standard Chartered Bank (Hong Kong) Limited on 1 July 2004.
Kaikhushru Shiavax Nargolwala (2004–2007)
 Jaspal Singh Bindra (2007–2015)

List of Former Hong Kong Chief Executives  
Since the local incorporation of Standard Chartered Bank (Hong Kong) Limited on 1 July 2004. 
 Peter David Sullivan (2004–2007)
 Benjamin Hung Pi-cheng (2008–2014)
 May Tan Siew-boi (2014–2017)

See also
List of banks in Hong Kong
Standard Chartered
Hong Kong Marathon

References

External links

Standard Chartered Hong Kong Homepage
Manhattan Card
A Hong Kong bank note issued by the Chartered Bank in 1962-1975, front, back

Standard Chartered
Banks of Hong Kong
Banks established in 2004
Banknote issuers of Hong Kong